Mystery Road is the third studio album by the Hard Rock/Southern Rock band Drivin' N' Cryin', released on March 28, 1989, by Island Records. The Washington Post said the album "remains a classic of the genre".

Overview
Originally, R.E.M. guitarist Peter Buck, a friend of the band, was going to produce the album, and they recorded demos together. However, Island Records refused and chose Scott McPherson to be the producer.

Mystery Road "is like a map of late-'80s college radio, wandering from folky protest songs to crunch-heavy hard rock to warm, pseudo-country rock, with a little punk thrown in for good measure.".

"Straight to Hell" is the band's most well-known song. Singer/guitarist Kevn Kinney said of the song:

"Honeysuckle Blue" was a "gorgeous Southern rock ballad that sounded like it should have been a big hit". Kinney recalled it was 

On October 6, 2017, Mystery Road was reissued with the original Peter Buck demos as bonus tracks.

Darius Rucker's fifth album When Was the Last Time was released October 20, 2017 and featured a cover of "Straight to Hell" with guests Jason Aldean, Luke Bryan, and Charles Kelley. Darius said the song "was huge in my day—when it was played in the bar, every single person in the bar was singing and hugging their best friend".

Reception

Denise Sullivan of AllMusic called Mystery Road the "least memorable record in the Drivin' n' Cryin' canon". Red Dirt Report'''s Andrew W. Griffin wrote of the reissue that "this new rerelease of a 28-year old album from Drivin' N' Cryin' is refreshing, primarily because we get to hear a band really starting to take off and become the band that refuses to throw in the towel all these years later".

Track listing

Personnel
The following people contributed to Mystery Road:Drivin' N Cryin'
 Buren Fowler – Guitar, Resonator Guitar [Dobro]
 Kevn Kinney – Guitar, Vocals
 Tim Nielsen – Bass, Vocals (Background), Percussion
 Jeff Sullivan – Drums, Percussion, Vocals (Background)

Additional personnel
 Scott MacPherson – Acoustic Guitar, Twelve-string Guitar
 Edd Miller – Banjo
 Randy DeLay – Drums
 Peter Buck – Dulcimer [Electric]
 Mikel Kinney – Fiddle [Mountain Fiddle]
 Gary Nielsen – Organ [Hammond B-3]
 Michelle Malone – Vocals
 Kevn Kinney, Scott MacPherson, Tim Nielsen – Producer
 Dan Vaganek, Edd Miller – Assistant Engineer
 Scott MacPherson – Recorder, Mixer
 Norma Kinney – Paintings

See alsoMacDougal Blues'', a 1990 Kevn Kinney solo album that features members of Drivin' 'n Cryin'

References

External links
 Mystery Road page on Drivin' N Cryin's official website

1989 albums
Island Records albums
Drivin N Cryin albums